Dimiter Gotscheff (26 April 1943 in Parvomai, Bulgaria – 20 October 2013 in Berlin) was a Bulgarian-born German theater director. His work is often associated with dramatist and director Heiner Müller.

References

External links 
Dimiter Gotscheff: 50 Directors working at German Theatres from the Goethe-Institut.
Dimiter Gotscheff's IMDB page

German theatre directors
Postmodern theatre
1943 births
2013 deaths
German people of Bulgarian descent
People from Parvomay